The New Testament frequently cites Jewish scripture to support the claim of the Early Christians that Jesus was the promised Jewish Messiah, but few of these citations are actual predictions in their original context. The majority of these quotations and references are taken from the Book of Isaiah, but they range over the entire corpus of Jewish writings.

Jews do not regard any of these as having been fulfilled by Jesus, and in some cases do not regard them as messianic prophecies at all. Old Testament prophecies about Jesus are either not thought to be prophecies by biblical scholars (as the verses make no claim of predicting anything) or do not explicitly refer to the Messiah. Historical criticism is unable to argue for the fulfillment of prophecy or that Jesus was indeed the Messiah because he fulfilled messianic prophecies—as historical criticism has no way to "construct such an argument" within that academic method, as that is a theological claim rather than a secular academic claim.

Overview: prophecy and biblical scholarship
The Hebrew scriptures were an important source for the New Testament authors. There are 27 direct quotations in the Gospel of Mark, 54 in Matthew, 24 in Luke, and 14 in John, and the influence of the scriptures is vastly increased when allusions and echoes are included, with half of Mark's gospel being made up of allusions to and citations of the scriptures.  Matthew contains all Mark's quotations and introduces around 30 more, sometimes in the mouth of Jesus, sometimes as his own commentary on the narrative, and Luke makes allusions to all but three of the Old Testament books.

Gospel of Matthew
The Gospel of Matthew has the largest number of messianic quotations from the Old Testament. In order:
 Matthew 1:18-25:
18: Now the birth of Jesus the Messiah took place in this way. When his mother Mary had been engaged to Joseph, but before they lived together, she was found to be with child from the Holy Spirit.
19: Her husband Joseph, being a righteous man and unwilling to expose her to public disgrace, planned to dismiss her quietly.
20: But just when he had resolved to do this, an angel of the Lord appeared to him in a dream and said, "Joseph, son of David, do not be afraid to take Mary as your wife, for the child conceived in her is from the Holy Spirit.
21: She will bear a son, and you are to name him Jesus, for he will save his people from their sins."
22: All this took place to fulfill what had been spoken by the Lord through the prophet:
23: "Look, the virgin shall conceive and bear a son, and they shall name him Emmanuel," which means, "God is with us."
24: When Joseph awoke from sleep, he did as the angel of the Lord commanded him; he took her as his wife,
25: but had no marital relations with her until she had borne a son; and he named him Jesus. 

The quotation at verse 23 is from Isaiah 7:14, in which the prophet Isaiah tells King Ahaz to ask a sign from God that Ahaz's enemies will not be permitted to destroy him; Ahaz refuses, and Isaiah tells the king that he will have the sign whether he asks for it or not: 
7:13 "Listen, house of David! Is it not enough to try the patience of men? Will you also try the patience of my God?
7:14 therefore the Lord himself shall give you a sign: the maiden is with child and she will bear a son, and will call his name Immanuel.
7:15 By the time he learns to reject the bad and choose the good, he will be eating curds and honey.
7:16 For before the child knows to reject the bad and choose the good, desolation will come upon the land of the two kings before whom you now cower."

The word translated here as "maiden" is almah, meaning a young woman of childbearing age rather than a virgin. Matthew, however, used the Greek translation of Isaiah rather than the Hebrew original, and the word that appears there is parthenos, meaning virgin.

Prophecies Christians consider fulfilled

Daniel 9:24–27 

The general scholarly view is that the author of Daniel is writing a contemporaneous account of the Maccabean Revolt c. 167 BCE and the "an anointed one shall be cut off" refers to the murder of the high priest Onias III; the "abomination that desolates" refers to Antiochus IV Epiphanes erecting a statue of Zeus in the Temple.
References to "most holy", "anointed one" and "prince" have been interpreted by Christians as speaking of Jesus, and the phrase "anointed one shall be cut off" as pointing to his crucifixion, the "troops of the prince who is to come" being taken to refer to the Romans who destroyed Jerusalem and the Temple in 70 AD.

Deuteronomy 18:15
 speaks of a prophet who would be raised up from among the Jewish nation:

By the time of Jesus, this promise of Moses was understood to refer to a special individual. In John 6:14, after the multiplication of the loaves, people are quoted as saying, "This is truly the Prophet, the one who is to come into the world." In John 7:40, On the last day of the feast (tabernacles/Booths), the great day...Many of the people, therefore, when they heard this saying, said, Of a truth this is the Prophet. In , Peter said that Jesus was the fulfillment of this promise.

Ezekiel 37:24, 25–27 

Ezekiel 37:24 refers to a person coming from the House of David as the servant of God, unique Shepherd of Israel, which will rule over the House of Judah (v. 16) and over the Tribe of Joseph (v. 17) so that he will "make them one stick, and they shall be one in mine hand" (v. 19), in a unique nation of Israel.

Verses from to 15 to 24 cannot be referring to King David, since the united monarchy of Israel was divided in two reigns  the death of his son Solomon (999–931 BCE), son of David. Furthermore, Ezekiel (622–570 BCE) wrote in the seventh century BCE, four centuries after this subject of the biblical narration, nevertheless adopting a prophecy that is by its nature usually referred to future happenings. Therefore, as the "stick of Judah" stands for the House of Judah, and the "stick of Joseph" stands for his tribe (verse 19), the expression "David my servant shall be king over them" (verse 24) may be read as a prophecy about a person of the House of David, which would have ruled over one nation in one land, gathered upon the mountains of Israel on every side of the earth.

The narration continues as follows: 

They will "live" ('made for thee to dwell' [KJV/ESV] in Song of The Sea Exodus 15:17) in the land.  The "dwelling place" (Hebrew mishkan מִשְׁכָּן Exodus 25:9) recalls the wilderness tabernacle. The Sanctuary (Hebrew miqdash מִקְדָּשׁ Exodus 15:17) points rather to the Temple, in particular the renewed Temple, which will occupy Ezekiel's attention in the last chapters of 40–48.

Christianity believes that Ezekiel's Temple is more glorious than the Tabernacle of Moses (Exodus 25–40) and the Temple of Solomon, pointing forward to several beliefs:
(1) the glory in which God dwells with man in the Messiah, John 1:14: "The Word became a human being and lived with us, and we saw his Sh'khinah" (שָׁכֵחַ Exodus 25:8) (CJB)
(2) The Messiah's body is the Temple, : "Yeshua answered them, 'Destroy this temple, and in three days I will raise it up again.' The Judeans said, 'It took 46 years to build this Temple, and you're going to raise it in three days?' But the 'temple' he had spoken of was his body." (CJB)
(3) the messianic community as the Temple, : "Don't you know that you people are God's Temple and that God's Spirit lives in you?",  "You have been built on the foundation of the emissaries and the prophets, with the cornerstone being Yeshua the Messiah himself. In union with him the whole building is held together, and it is growing into a holy temple in union with the Lord. Yes, in union with him, you yourselves are being built together into a spiritual dwelling-place for God!",  "...you yourselves, as living stones, are being built into a spiritual house to be cohanim set apart for God to offer spiritual sacrifices acceptable to him through Yeshua the Messiah." (CJB)
(4) the body of the individual believer, : "Or don't you know that your body is a Temple for the Ruach HaKodesh who lives inside you, whom you received from God? The fact is, you don't belong to yourselves" (CJB)
(5) the heavenly Jerusalem, Revelation 21:9-22:5

Judaism holds that the Messiah has not yet arrived namely because of the belief that the Messianic Age has not started yet. Jews believe that the Messiah will completely change life on earth and that pain and suffering will be conquered, thus initiating the Kingdom of God and the Messianic Age on earth. Christian belief varies, with one segment holding that the Kingdom of God is not worldly at all, while another believe that the Kingdom is both spiritual and will be of this world in a Messianic Age where Jesus will rule on the throne of David. Most Jews hold that the Kingdom of God will be on earth and the Messiah will occupy the throne of David. Christians (in particular Evangelicals) believe that it is both, and claim that it is spiritual (the historical Jesus completed salvation) and within right now, and physical and outward at the return of the Messiah (Second Coming of Jesus as "New Jerusalem, coming down out of heaven from God" Revelation 21:1–4).

While Christians have cited the following as prophecies referencing the life, status, and legacy of Jesus, Jewish scholars maintain that these passages are not messianic prophecies and are based on mistranslations or misunderstanding of the Hebrew texts.

Hosea 11:1

In its original context, this text from Hosea referred to the deliverance of the people of Israel from bondage in Egypt. The Gospel of Matthew chapter 2 applies it to the return from Egypt of Jesus and his family as a messianic prophecy:

Isaiah

Isaiah 7:14

Early Christian tradition interpreted this verse as a reference to the mother of Jesus. The prophet Isaiah, addressing king Ahaz of Judah, promises the king that God will destroy his enemies, and as a sign that his oracle is a true one he predicts that a "young woman" ("almah") standing nearby will shortly give birth to a child whose name will be Immanuel, "God is with us", and that the threat from the enemy kings will be ended before the child grows up. The almah might be the mother of Hezekiah or a daughter of Isaiah, although there are problems with both candidatesHezekiah, for example, was apparently born nine years before the prophecy was given,but the biblical chronology for Hezekiah is confused, and his identity as the prophesied child is strongly suggested by the reference to Immanuel's "land" in 8.8 and 10.

The Gospel of Matthew references this verse to support its claim of the supernatural origins of Jesus. In the time of Jesus, however, the Jews of Palestine no longer spoke Hebrew, and Isaiah had to be translated into Greek and Aramaic, the two commonly used languages. In the original Hebrew, the word almah means a young woman of childbearing age or who is a mother, but the Greek translation of Isaiah 7:14 rendered almah as parthenos, the Greek word for "virgin". Scholars agree that almah has nothing to do with virginity, but many conservative American Christians still judge the acceptability of new Bible translations by the way they deal with Isaiah 7:14.

Isaiah 8:14

Isaiah 8:22–9:1 (9:1–2) 

According to both Jewish and Christian interpretation, the prophet Isaiah was commanded to inform the people of Israel in a prophecy that Sennacherib's plunder of the Ten Tribes was at hand, and that Nebuchadnezzar's spoil of Jerusalem, in later years, was coming nearer.

During the Syro-Ephraimite War, Isaiah opposed an alliance with Assyria, and counseled Ahaz to rely instead on the assurances of the Davidic covenant. This view was not well received at court. Assyria absorbed the lands of Zebulon and Naphtali to form the provinces of Galilee, Dor, and Gilead. Judah became a vassal kingdom of the Assyrians.

The reign of Hezekiah saw a notable increase in the power of the Judean state.Hezekiah was successful in his wars against the Philistines, driving them back in a series of victorious battles as far as Gaza. He thus not only retook all the cities that his father had lost, but even conquered others belonging to the Philistines. He also looked to attempting to reincorporate some of the desolate northern territories into the kingdom of Judah and thus restore the boundaries of the country as it was under David. At this time Judah was the strongest nation on the Assyrian-Egyptian frontier. The "messianic oracle" ("The people walking in darkness have seen a great light; Upon those living in the land of deep darkness a light has dawned.") may have coincided with the coronation of Hezekiah and looked toward the deliverance of the Israelites living in the northern provinces.

According to Jewish tradition, the salvation of which he speaks is the miraculous end of Sennacherib's siege of Jerusalem (see Isaiah 36 and 37) in the days of the Prince of Peace, King Hezekiah, a son of King Ahaz.

Matthew cites the messianic oracle, when Jesus began his ministry in Galilee:

While the Gospel of Matthew modifies a Greek Septuagint interpretation of scripture (Isaiah 8:23–9:2), in the Masoretic text it refers to the "region of the nations".

Isaiah 9:6,7 (Masoretic 9:5,6)

In Jewish translations of the Hebrew Bible the verse numbering is different (9:6 in the Christian Old Testament is numbered 9:5 in Hebrew Bible versions).

Newer Jewish versions do not translate the verse as follows:
Isaiah 9:6  (Masoretic 9:5) "For a child is born unto us, a son hath been given unto us, and the government is placed on his shoulders; and his name is called, Wonderful, counsellor of the mighty God, of the everlasting Father, the prince of peace", (Lesser)
Isaiah 9:6  (Masoretic 9:5) "For a child is born unto us, a son is given unto us; and the government is upon his shoulder; and his name is called Pele- joez-el-gibbor-Abi-ad-sar-shalom"; (JPS 1917)

This verse is expressly applied to the Messiah in the Targum, i.e. Aramaic commentary on the Hebrew Bible.

Some Christians believe that this verse refers to the birth of Jesus as the Messiah. The verse reads in Christian bible versions:

Isaiah 11:12

Some commentators view this as an unfulfilled prophecy, arguing that the Jewish people have not all been gathered in Israel. Some Christians refer to the foundation of the State of Israel as fulfillment of this prophecy. Others argue that the fulfillment is that Jesus as Messiah brings all nations to himself (cf. 11:10 "Nations will seek his counsel / And his abode will be honored.") citing  ("And I, when I am lifted up from the earth, will draw all people to myself.") and Paul in  when he quotes , emphasizing the inclusion of the gentiles into the people of God.

The Jews then said, 'It has taken forty-six years to build this temple, and will you raise it up in three days?' But he was speaking about the temple of his body."). In him you also are being built together into a dwelling place for God by the Spirit.").

Isaiah 28:16

Isaiah 53:5

Isaiah 53 is probably the most famous example claimed by Christians to be a messianic prophecy fulfilled by Jesus. It speaks of one known as the "suffering servant," who suffers because of the sins of others. Jesus is said to fulfill this prophecy through his death on the cross. The verse from Isaiah 53:5 has traditionally been understood by many Christians to speak of Jesus as the Messiah.
The claim frequently advanced by Christian apologists is that the noted Jewish commentator, Rashi (1040 CE – 1105 CE), was the first to identify the suffering servant of Isaiah 53 with the nation of Israel. The consensus among Jewish is that the "servant" in Isaiah 52-53 refers to the nation of Israel is misleading as by the implication then, the pagan nations would essentially be healed by making Jewish nation suffer and the more they strike them,the more they are to be healed.
However, many still view the "suffering servant" as a reference to the whole Jewish people, regarded as one individual, and more specifically to the Jewish people deported to Babylon. However, in aggadic midrash on the books of Samuel, a compendium of rabbinic folklore, historical anecdotes and moral exhortations,  is messianically interpreted.

One of the first claims in the New Testament that Isaiah 53 is a prophecy of Jesus comes from the Book of Acts chapter 8 verses 26–36, which describes a scene in which God commands Philip the Apostle to approach an Ethiopian eunuch who is sitting in a chariot, reading aloud to himself from the Book of Isaiah. The eunuch comments that he does not understand what he is reading (Isaiah 53) and Philip explains to him that the passage refers to Jesus: "And the eunuch answered Philip, and said, I pray thee, of whom speaketh the prophet this? Of himself, or of some other man? Then Philip opened his mouth, and began at the same scripture, and preached unto him Jesus."

The (suffering) Servant, as referring to the Jewish people, suffering from the cruelties of the nations, is a theme in the Servant songs and is mentioned previously.

Jeremiah 31:15

Matthew 2:17–18 gives the Massacre of the Innocents by Herod the Great as the fulfillment of a prophecy allegedly given by this verse in Jeremiah.

The phrase "because her children are no more" is believed to refer to the captivity of Rachel's children in Assyria. The subsequent verses describe their return to Israel.

Micah 5:2 (Micah 5:1 in Hebrew)

This verse near the end of Micah's prophecy on the Babylonian captivity has been interpreted by Christian apologists, and by Pharisees mentioned in the Gospel of John, as a prophecy that the Messiah would be born in Bethlehem.

The verse describes the clan of Bethlehem, who was the son of Caleb's second wife, Ephrathah. (1 Chr. 2:18, 2:50–52, 4:4) Bethlehem Ephrathah is the town and clan from which king David was born, and this passage refers to the future birth of a new Davidic heir.

Although the Gospel of Matthew and the Gospel of Luke give different accounts of the birth of Jesus, they both place the birth in Bethlehem. The Gospel of Matthew describes Herod the Great as asking the chief priests and scribes of Jerusalem where the Messiah was to be born. They respond by quoting Micah, "In Beit-Lechem of Y'hudah," they replied, "because the prophet wrote, 'And you, Beit-Lechem in the land of Y'hudah, are by no means the least among the rulers of Y'hudah; for from you will come a Ruler who will shepherd my people Isra'el.

The idea that Bethlehem was to be the birthplace of the Messiah appears in no Jewish source before the 4th century CE. Jewish tradition appears to have emphasised the idea that the birthplace of the Messiah was not known.

Some modern scholars consider the birth stories as inventions by the gospel writers, created to glorify Jesus and present his birth as the fulfillment of prophecy.

Psalms
Some portions of the Psalms are considered prophetic in Judaism, even though they are listed among the Ketuvim (Writings) and not the Nevi'im (Prophets).

The words Messiah and Christ mean "anointed one". In ancient times Jewish leaders were anointed with olive oil when they assumed their position (e.g. David, Saul, Isaac, Jacob). And Messiah is used as a name for kings in the Hebrew Bible: in  David finds King Saul's killer and asks, "Why were you not afraid to lift your hand to destroy the LORD's anointed?"

In many Psalms, whose authorship are traditionally ascribed to King David (i.e. Messiah David), the author writes about his life in third person, referring to himself as "the/God's/your messiah" while clearly discussing his military exploits. Thus it can be argued that many of the portions that are asserted to be prophetic Psalms may not be.

Psalm 2

Psalm 2 can be argued to be about David; the authors of Acts and the Epistle to the Hebrews interpreted it as relating to Jesus. Saint Augustine identifies "the nations [that] conspire, and the peoples [that] plot in vain" as the enemies referred to in Psalm 110: "Sit at my right hand, until I make your enemies your footstool."

Verse 7. The LORD is the messiah's father. In Judaism the phrase "Son of God" has very different connotations than in Christianity, not referring to literal descent but to the righteous who have become conscious of God's father of mankind.

Christians cite Herod and Pontius Pilate setting themselves against Jesus as evidence that Psalm 2 refers to him.
 interprets Jesus' rising from the dead as confirmation of verse 7 ("You are my son, today I have begotten you").

Hebrews 1:5 employs verse 7 in order to argue that Jesus is superior to the angels, i.e., Jesus is superior as a mediator between God and man. "For to what angel did God ever say, Thou art my Son, today I have begotten thee?" However, the phrase "son of God" appears in the Hebrew Bible to describe others than the coming Messiah, including David and Jacob.

Texts vary in the exact wording of the phrase beginning , with "kiss his foot", and "kiss the Son" being most common in various languages for centuries (including the King James Version), though not in original Hebrew Manuscripts such as the Dead Sea Scrolls. The proper noun was reduced to "son" in the Revised Version. The marginal interpretation accompanying the latter reads, "Worship in purity," which according to Joseph Hertz, "is in agreement with Jewish authorities."

Psalm 16

The interpretation of Psalm 16 as a messianic prophecy is common among Christian evangelical hermeneutics.

According to the preaching of Peter, this prophecy is about the messiah's triumph over death, i.e., the resurrection of Jesus.

Also of note is what Paul said in the synagogue at Antioch. "And as for the fact that he raised him from the dead, no more to return to corruption, he spoke in this way, 'I will give you the holy and sure blessings of David.' Therefore, he also says in another psalm, 'Thou wilt not let thy Holy One see corruption.' For David, after he had served the counsel of God in his own generation, fell asleep, and saw corruption; but he whom God raised up saw no corruption" (Acts 13: 34–37).

Psalm 22

Two of the Gospels ( and ) quote Jesus as speaking these words of Psalm 22 from the cross;

The other two canonical Gospels give different accounts of the words of Jesus.  quotes  ("Into your hands I commit my spirit") while John has Jesus say "It is finished" (John 19:30). Some scholars see this as evidence that the words of Jesus were not part of a pre-Gospel Passion narrative, but were added later by the Gospel writers.

In most Hebrew manuscripts, such as the Masoretic,  (verse 17 in the Hebrew verse numbering) reads כארי ידי ורגלי ("like a lion my hands and my feet"). Many Modern English translations render this as "they have pierced my hands and my feet", starting with the Coverdale Bible which translated Luther's durchgraben (dig through, penetrate) as pearsed, with durchgraben being a variation of the Septuagint's ωρυξαν "dug". This translation is highly controversial. It is asserted in Christian apologetics that the Dead Sea Scrolls lend weight to the translation as "They have pierced my hands and my feet", by lengthening the yud in the Hebrew word כארי (like a lion) into a vav כארו "Kaaru", which is not a word in the Hebrew language but when the aleph is omitted becomes כרו, dig, similar to the Septuagint translation. However, this view is contested considering the Nahal Hever scribe's other numerous misspellings, such as one in the very same sentence, where ידיה is written instead of the correct ידי, making the Hebrew word ידי yadai "hands" into ידיה yadehah, "her hands". Christian apologists argue that this passage refers to Jesus.

Psalm 34

Ray Pritchard has described Psalm 34:20 as a messianic prophecy. In its account of the crucifixion of Jesus, the Gospel of John interprets it as a prophecy and presents some of the details as fulfillment.

Psalm 69

Christians believe that this verse refers to Jesus' time on the cross in which he was given a sponge soaked in vinegar to drink, as seen in Matthew 27:34, Mark 15:23, and John 19:29.

Psalm 110

"A royal psalm (see Psalm 2 intro). It is quite difficult because verse 3 is totally obscure, and the psalm speakers often. In Christian interpretation, it is understood as a reference to Jesus, as a messianic and sometimes eschatological psalm; Radak polemicizes against this view"
1. Here God is speaking to the king, called my lord; Perhaps these are the words spoken by a prophet. The king is very proximate to God, in a position of privilege, imagined as being on His right hand in the Divine Council. The second-in-command was seated to the right of the king in the ancient Near East. Such images are rare in psalms, but see . If the king trods on the back of his enemies (see ), they poetically become his "Footstool" 2. In contrast to v.1, God is spoken of in the third person. The Zion tradition (see) and royal tradition are here connected. While v.1-2 express the great power of the king, they also emphasize it comes from God" (YHWH).

Psalm 110 is viewed as messianic in both Jewish and Christian tradition.
Christian authors have interpreted this psalm as a messianic passage in light of several New Testament passages. Pope Benedict XVI noted, "The royal glorification expressed at the beginning of the Psalm was adopted by the New Testament as a messianic prophecy. For this reason the verse is among those most frequently used by New Testament authors, either as an explicit quotation or as an allusion." He further connects this image to the concept of Christ the King.

In , Peter refers to the similar glorification of Jesus in the context of the resurrection

The gospel writers interpret the psalm as a messianic prophecy:

According to Augustine of Hippo,: "It was necessary that all this should be prophesied, announced in advance. We needed to be told so that our minds might be prepared. He did not will to come so suddenly that we would shrink from him in fear; rather are we meant to expect him as the one in whom we have believed."

2 Samuel 7:14

Hebrews 1:5 quotes this verse as, "I will be his Father, and he will be my Son." In Samuel, the verse continues: "When he does wrong, I will punish him with the rod of men, with floggings inflicted by men." The phrase as quoted in Hebrews is generally seen as a reference to the Davidic covenant, whereby God assures the king of his continued mercy to him and his descendants.

Wisdom 2:12–20

The Wisdom of Solomon is one of the Deuterocanonical books of the Old Testament. The Deuterocanonical books are considered canonical by Catholics, Eastern Orthodox and Oriental Orthodox, but are considered non-canonical by Jews and Protestants.

Zechariah

Zechariah 9:9

Christian authors have interpreted Zechariah 9:9 as a prophecy of an act of messianic self-humiliation.  The Gospel of John links this verse to the account of Jesus' entry into Jerusalem:

The Synoptic Gospels make clear that Jesus arranged this event, thus consciously fulfilling the prophecy.

The Gospel of Matthew describes Jesus' triumphant entry on Palm Sunday as a fulfillment of this verse in Zechariah. Matthew describes the prophecy in terms of a colt and a separate donkey, whereas the original only mentions the colt; the reference in Zechariah is a Jewish parallelism referring only to a single animal, and the gospels of Mark, Luke, and John state Jesus sent his disciples after only one animal.

In the most ancient Jewish writings Zechariah 9:9 is applied to the Messiah. According to the Talmud, so firm was the belief in the ass on which the Messiah is to ride that "if anyone saw an ass in his dream, he will see salvation". The verse is also Messianically quoted in Sanh. 98 a, in Pirqé de R. Eliez. c. 31, and in several of the Midrashim.

Zechariah 12:10

Zechariah 12:10 is another verse commonly cited by Christian authors as a messianic prophecy fulfilled by Jesus.

In some of the most ancient Jewish writings, Zechariah 12:10 is applied to the Messiah Ben Joseph in the Talmud, and so is verse 12 ("The land will wail, each family by itself: The family of the House of David by themselves, and their women by themselves; the family of the House of Nathan by themselves, and their women by themselves"), there being, however, a difference of opinion whether the mourning is caused by the death of the Messiah Ben Joseph, or else on account of the evil concupiscence (Yetzer hara).

The Gospel of John makes reference to this prophecy when referring to the crucifixion of Jesus, as can be seen in the following account: 

Zechariah 12:10 is often regarded as mistranslated by modern-day adherents to Judaism. It is often translated by Jews as follows:

The Jewish-Christian debate on the correct rendering of Zechariah 12:10 oftentimes come down to the translation of the Hebrew phrase "את אשר (’êṯ-’ă·šer or et-asher)" which can mean either "whom" or "about" depending on the context.

Verses read as Davidic line prophecies

Debate about prophecy fulfillment
    
Among Christian believers, opinion varies as to which Old Testament passages are messianic prophecies and which are not, and whether the prophecies they claim to have been fulfilled are intended to be prophecies. The authors of these Old Testament prophecies often appear to be describing events that had already occurred. For example, the New Testament verse states:

This is referring to the Old Testament verse Hosea 11:1. However, that passage reads,

Skeptics say that the Hosea passage clearly is talking about a historical event and therefore the passage clearly is not a prophecy.

According to modern scholarship, the suffering servant described in Isaiah chapter 53 is actually the Jewish people. According to some, the rabbinic response, e.g., Rashi and Maimonides, is that, although the suffering servant passage is clearly prophetic and even if Psalm 22 is prophetic, the Messiah has not come yet; therefore, the passages could not be talking about Jesus. As noted above, there is some controversy about the phrase "they have pierced my hands and my feet".

For modern Bible scholars, either the verses make no claim of predicting future events, or the verses make no claim of speaking about the Messiah. They view the argument that Jesus is the Messiah because he has fulfilled prophecy as a fallacy, i.e. it is a confession of faith masquerading as objective rational argumentation. As Christian-turned-atheist Farrell Till argues in his Skeptical Review,

See also
 Bible prophecy
 Biblical hermeneutics
 Christianity and Judaism
 Christian views on the Old Covenant
 Exegesis
 Jesus in Christianity
 Judaism's view of Jesus
 Messiah in Judaism
 Muhammad and the Bible
 Shiloh (biblical figure)
 New Covenant
 Supersessionism
 Unfulfilled Christian religious predictions

References

Bibliography

 

 

 
 
 Herbert Lockyer All the Messianic Prophecies of the Bible Zondervan 1988 
 Nelson Reference Guides Find It Fast Messianic Prophecies Fulfilled In Jesus Christ Nelson Reference 2001 
 Charles A. Briggs Messianic Prophecy: The Prediction of the Fulfilment of Redemption Through the Messiah Wipf & Stock Publishers 2005 
 Edward Riehm Messianic Prophecy: Its Origins, Historical Growth and Relation to New Testament Fulfillment Kessinger Publishing 2006 
 Aaron Kligerman Old Testament Messianic Prophecy Zondervan 1957 ASIN B000GSNPMQ
 Michael F. Bird, Are You the One Who Is to Come? Baker Academic 2008.

External links
Jewish analysis
 Ask Rabbi Simmons
 OutreachJudaism.com
 Drazin.com
 WhatJewsBelieve.org
 Lets Get Biblical tape series online at beJewish.org

Evangelical Christian analysis
 Messianic Prophecies Fulfilled by Jesus Christ
 Clarifying Christianity.com
 Messianic Prophecies by J. Hampton Keathley, III, Th.M.
 Messiah Revealed: Over 300 Prophecies from the Hebrew Scriptures Reveal Messiah

Skeptical and Critical analysis
 Old Testament Prophecies of Jesus Proven False, by Thomas Paine
 The Fabulous Prophecies of the Messiah, by Jim Lippard
 Stephen Jay Gould's response to prophecy fulfillment
 The Problem of the Virgin Birth Prophecy
 A Critical Examination of the Seventy Weeks Prophecy
 The Grounds of Christianity Examined by Comparing The New Testament with the Old, by George Bethune English 

Christian messianism
Jesus
Old Testament
Prophecy in Christianity